The Undying Land is a Lost race novel by William Gilmour.  It was first published in 1985 by Donald M. Grant, Publisher, Inc. in an edition of 1,300 copies.

Plot introduction
The novel concerns the adventures of Starrett, an aviator who becomes lost in Africa and discovers a lost civilization.

References

1985 American novels
American fantasy novels
Novels set in Africa
Donald M. Grant, Publisher books